Rander (also known as Rahe Neer or city of mosques) is a town in Surat district in the state of  Gujarat, India.

History 
There are some historic indications that Rander was an important port of Western Hind in the ancient era that conducted trade with the Arabian heartlands, Egypt, Sudan and beyond. During the rule of Shanprat in 200 AD, Jain, an important trading community in India worked here and built their temples in and around Rander.

It is believed that the Jain settlement dates back to earlier than 1200 AD when Rander was a small prosperous village that formed the hinterland of Suvali. Suvali was a thriving port town back then that had connections with the Middle East owing to the trade of crockery, silver articles, wooden artefacts and furniture. Also, Rander became a principal commercial centre, which had trading connections with many countries in Africa, the Middle East and Burma.  Also, ships laden with spices, silk, benzoin and porcelain from as far as Sumatra and China docked in Rander.

The earliest recorded mention of Rander was in the year 1050 in the book Kitab al Hind by Al Biruni.

Nawayath Arabs, who settled in the area by 1225, were the main traders. It was in 1225 A.D. that the Arabs came from Kufa, overpowering the existing Jain population whose traces can be observed in the old temples such as Manibhadra temple, Kanch nu Derasar (Mirror hall temple).

By the late medieval period, it had become an important port in western India, though smaller than ports such as Broach in Gujarat.

In 1514, the Portuguese traveller Duarte Barbosa wrote:

Thus according to Barbosa, the Moors of Rander did not observe the Islamic purdah. However the piety of Navayat Arabs is evident by the many mosques and durghas they built. By 1225, Arab merchants and sailors settled in the area after displacing the local Jain rulers. In 1874, the Hope Bridge was built across the river that connected Rander to villages on the other side of the river.

Rander Eid-Gah
Mughal emperor Jehangir and his companions, on their way to Ahmedabad, stopped at this historic place near Jehangirpur which is now called Rander Eid-Gah.

Jehangir accepted the invitation (dawat) from the mayor of Rander, Malik Tujjar. Malik Tujjar was one of the richest businessman of his time. To honour and welcome the emperor Jehangir, red carpet was laid from the Mayors palace to Jehangirpur. The dinner was served in golden plates. After the dinner was over, the plates were given to the charity.

Jehangir offered Friday prayer at the Jumma Masjid Rander and Eid Salah at Eid-Gah.

Today over 5 Lakh people around Rander offer their Eid Salah in the Eid-Gah.

Rander Mehfil-e-Islam

The Rander Mehfil-e-Islam Kutub Khana is a charity society of Muslims that was established and registered in 1888 and 1913 respectively. Mehfil-e-Islam has 17 trusts.

Rander/Surat City this millennia, post Islamic influence

1194    Kutb-Ud-Din Aibak (General of Shahab-Ud-Din Ghori) raided Rander & Surat.

1225    Arabs of Kufa settled in Rander.

1373    Muhammed Tughlak sacked and plundered Surat.

1391    Mastic Khan was appointed Governor of Surat and Rander.

1411    Muzfar Shah became Governor of Surat, and his son Masti Khan rebelled and was suppressed.

1496-1521    Period of Gopi Malik, the renowned Hindu trader of Surat.

1512    Portuguese plundered and burnt Surat.

1514    Gopi Malik befriended Portuguese.

1530    Antonio De Silveria, Portuguese chief plundered Surat second time.

1531    Portuguese plundered Surat and Rander third time.

1546    Khudavand Khan ( Safi Agha Turk of Raomi ) completed the construction of Castle of Surat.

1573    Mirzas rose in rebellion against Akbar.

1573    Akbar marched on Surat and laid a seize.

1573    Akbar captured Surat and appointed Kalij Khan as Commander of Castle.

1576    Surat Aththavisi Paraganas were surveyed by Raja Todarmal.

1583    Portuguese attempted to seize Surat.

1590    Surat was hailed as emporium of the world and became first class port.

1608    First English ship arrived at the mouth of Tapi (Surat).

1609    Second English ship arrived at Surat but was wrecked off and its crew landed at Gandevi.

1610    Malik Ambar plundered the Surat Aththavisi.

1612    Fight occurred between English and Portuguese at the mouth of river Tapi.

1612    English triumphed against Portuguese.

1612-1615    Aldsworth became President of English factory.

1613    English secured a Charter for trade from the Mughal Emperor.

1615    Portuguese defeated by the English.

1615-1623    Kerridge became the president of English factory.

1615    Sir Thomas Roc reached Surat.

1616    Dutch were given provisional permission to establish factory.

1618    Mukrab Khan, the Governor of Surat was recalled.

1618    Prince Khurram ( Later Shahjahan ) became Governor of Surat.

1618    Dutch negotiated a Treaty of Commerce with Prince Khurram.

1620-1642    French tried to gain foothold in Surat.

1623    De la Valle visited Surat.

1623-1626    Thomas Rastell became President of English factory.

1628    Mir Arab was appointed as Governor of Surat.

1630    Moiz-ul-Mulk was appointed as Governor of Surat.

1635    Jam Kuli was appointed Governor of Surat.

1638    Mandelslo visited Surat.

1639    Muhammad Khan was appointed as Governor of Surat.

1642    Tavernier visited Surat.

1644    Mowazaz Khan was appointed as Governor of Surat.

1648    Mazi-uz-Zaman was appointed as Governor of Surat.

1651    Jamkuli was appointed as Governor of Surat second time.

1653   Mustafa Khan was appointed Governor of Surat.

1655    Muhammad Sadak was appointed as Governor of Surat.

1657    Roshan Zamir was appointed as Governor of Surat.

1664    Shivaji launched first attack on Surat.

1669    Siddis of Janjira secured the admiralty of Mughal fleet in Surat.

1670    Shivaji led second attack on Surat.

1672    Shivaji's general demanded Chauth on Surat.

1676    Marathas captured the fort of Parnera.

1684    Great outbreak of plague in Surat.

1690    Ovington visited Surat.

1699    Khanderao Dabhade succeeded to collect Chauth on Surat.

1706    Maratha raids were carried out on the city. Maratha disturbances occurred in Surat Aththavisi Paraganas under chieftainship Of Pilaji Gaekwad.

1723    Pilaji established himself in Songadh (Sonpura).

1724    Pilaji vanquished Beram Khan and occupied whole territory around Surat.

1730    Ruling chief Durjansingh of Mandvi was deprived of his possessions by Damaji Gaikwad.

1733    Nawab Teg Bakht Khan was appointed governor.

1733    English negotiated with Teg Bakht Khan for Transfer of fleet subsidy from to 31st Sidi to the English in vain.

1734    English stopped the merchant ships from coming to the bar of Surat.

1734    Merchant community threatened Nawab Teg Bakht Khan to follow the English to Bombay.

1735    Settlement of the dispute of Nawab Teg Bakht Khan with English. Guards were removed from the factory.

1735    Quarrel between Teg Bakht Khan and Sidis of Janjira, regarding payment of Sidi's Tankha. August,

1735    Meditation of the English to settle the dispute between Sidis and Teg Bakht Khan concerning Sidis Tankha.

1735    Sidi captured mercantile ships at Surat.  Dayaram Teg Bakht Khan's Dewan (settled the dispute of Nawab's revenue of Aththavisi with Damajirao).

1735    Sidi released merchant ships.

Notable people 
 Shaikh Randeri (a.k.a. Shaikh Raneri) was famous for spreading the Islamic faith to Indonesia.Nuruddin ibn Ali ar-Raniri (also transliterated Nur ud-Din ar-Raniri / Randeri, died 1658) of Yemeni lineage was an Islamic mystic and scholar from Rander in Surat province of Gujarat, in India, who worked for several years in the court of the sultan of Aceh in what is now Indonesia. He was the most prolific of the authors of the Acehnese court, and helped contribute to its international reputation as a center of scholarship. His work was considered the oldest Muslim scholarship of South east Asia.

See also 
 List of tourist attractions in Surat

References 

Suburban area of Surat
Cities and towns in Surat district